Claudia Mijangos Azrac (born 25 May 1956) is a Mexican woman who was convicted of filicide. In April 1989, Mijangos stabbed her three children to death declaring she was obliged by a diabolical entity that possessed her. She was diagnosed with schizoaffective disorder and temporal lobe epilepsy. Therefore, she was sentenced to 30 years in prison, the maximum sentence for such a crime in Mexico. Mijangos was released from prison in 2019 and admitted to a psychiatric clinic. 

According to local legends, the house where she committed the crime is haunted. The site was televised by the Mexican paranormal television program, Extranormal and by the Mexican parapsychologist Carlos Trejo.

Background
Claudia Mijangos was born on 25 May 1956 in Sinaloa, Mexico, where she was raised in an upper middle-class family. In her youth, she was named beauty queen of her hometown of Mazatlán. After graduating in commerce, she married Alfredo Castaños Gutiérrez. They had three children. After the death of her parents, the family inherited a sizable amount of money and moved to Querétaro City, Querétaro. There, the three children were enrolled in the Catholic school Colegio Fray Luis de León, where Claudia Mijangos worked as a catechism teacher. Claudia later opened a clothing store downtown.

In the late 1980s, Claudia and her husband Alfredo began to develop marital problems. She began to display signs of emotional instability, according to relatives and friends. The couple attended marriage counseling with Dr. Jaime Flores of Instinto Asesino, a television show on Discovery Channel Mexico. Dr. Flores asserted that the power struggle apparent within the marriage was irreconcilable. Shortly after, Claudia became obsessed with Father Ramón, another teacher at the Colegio Fray Luis de León. Claudia and Alfredo separated in 1989.

Murders

When Claudia was 33 years old, she began to experience severe psychotic attacks in the months preceding the murders. These attacks reportedly involved hallucinations of demons and angels which left Claudia psychologically tormented.

On April 23, 1989, Claudia's husband picked up their children from a school fair and brought them to Claudia's house. There, Castaños and Claudia engaged in an intense argument. He probed her about Father Ramon and articulated his desire to get back together. Furious, Claudia defended Father Ramon and rejected Castaños's desire to rekindle their relationship. Before he left, Claudia threatened Castaños saying he would be sorry. After locking the door behind him, Claudia went upstairs to tuck her children in bed and went to sleep.

A few hours later on April 24, 1989, at around four in the morning, Claudia awoke to loud voices in her head. She stated that the voices told her Mazatlan had disappeared and that "all of Queretaro was a spirit". Desperate, Claudia called her friend Veronica Vazquez who asked Claudia to calm down. Veronica promised to come in the morning to help her. Following the call, Claudia got out of bed, dressed, went to the kitchen and took three knives while her children were still sleeping.

At about five in the morning Claudia woke up her 6-year-old son Alfredo and attacked him with a knife. Leaning on the his bed, she grabbed his left hand and completely amputated it. Alfredo screamed out which awoke his eldest sister, 11-year-old Claudia Maria, came to the room and begged her mother to stop. Switching knives, Claudia rushed over her eldest daughter and stabbed her six times. Wounded, Claudia María managed to leave the room and loudly pleaded her mother for mercy. The screams woke the neighbors. Claudia took the third knife and stabbed her nine-year-old daughter Ana Belén in the heart. Claudia ran downstairs, searching for Claudia Maria who had fainted on the dining room floor and stabbed her again. She then dragged her upstairs and placed her lifeless body in the master bedroom.

Crime scene and evidence

References

External links
 The house of Claudia Mijangos on Google Maps - Street View.

1956 births
Filicides
Living people
Mexican female murderers
Mexican ghosts
Mexican murderers of children
Mexican people convicted of murder
People convicted of murder by Mexico
People with epilepsy
People with schizoaffective disorder
People from Mazatlán
People from Querétaro
Reportedly haunted locations in Mexico